Tyler Perry's House of Payne is an American comedy-drama television series created and produced by playwright, director, and producer Tyler Perry. The show revolved around a multi-generational family living under one roof in Atlanta led by patriarch Curtis Payne and his wife Ella. The show premiered in syndication on June 21, 2006, and new episodes were broadcast exclusively on TBS from June 6, 2007, until August 10, 2012. While primarily a comedy sitcom, House of Payne was known for featuring dark themes and subject matter, such as substance abuse and addiction. It also had elements of slapstick. The storyline of the show is serialized, with many references to past episodes, creating a continuing story arc.

Since its revival in 2020, House of Payne aired more episodes — a total of 311 — than any other television series (of any genre) with a predominantly African American cast, surpassing The Jeffersons (253 episodes), Family Matters (215 episodes), and The Cosby Show (202 episodes).

The ninth season premiered on March 23, 2022, on BET.

Series overview

Episodes

Pilot episodes (2006)
These episodes had a limited run in syndication. They are also considered as test pilot episodes. These episodes are somewhat different from the current series considering that Ella and Curtis were C.J.'s parents, instead of aunt and uncle as they are currently portrayed, and Calvin Payne didn't exist. Demetria McKinney was not a series regular.

Season 1 (2006)

Season 2 (2007–08)

Season 3 (2008–09)

Season 4 (2009–10)

Season 5 (2011–12)

Season 6 (2012)

Season 7 (2020–21)

Season 8 (2021–22)

Season 9 (2022)

Season 10 (2023)

References

External links
 

Tyler Perry's House of Payne